Nenê (born Maybyner Rodney Hilário; September 13, 1982) is a Brazilian former professional basketball player. Known previously as Nenê Hilario, he legally changed his name to simply Nenê in 2003.

Early life
Born Maybyner Rodney Hilário in São Carlos, Brazil, he was nicknamed "Nenê" (a variation of Brazilian Portuguese for baby) because he was the youngest in both his family and his group of childhood friends. Like most Brazilian children, he played soccer from an early age; due to his skills, he was invited to train with pro clubs. In the mid-1990s, he started playing basketball at Escola de Basquete Meneghelli in his hometown. He later played professionally for Vasco da Gama from 1999 to 2002. In 2001, he joined the Brazilian national team and participated in the Goodwill Games.

Professional career

Denver Nuggets (2002–2012)
Nenê's successful three-year stint playing in Brazil earned him an NBA pre-draft camp invitation in Chicago in 2002. He was later selected with the seventh overall pick in the 2002 NBA draft by the New York Knicks, who traded him to the Denver Nuggets. He was the first Brazilian ever to be selected in the first round of the NBA draft.

Nenê began the 2002–03 season as a bench player, but ended it as a starter, averaging 10.5 points, 6.1 rebounds and 1.6 steals. He ranked sixth in the NBA in field goal percentage (.519) and 20th in steals. He subsequently earned NBA All-Rookie first team honors.

In his second season, Nenê played and started in 77 games, averaging 11.8 points, 6.5 rebounds and 1.5 steals in 32.5 minutes per games. He ranked fourth in the NBA in field goal percentage (.530).

In his third season, Nenê missed 27 games – 13 games due to a sprained medial collateral ligament in his left knee, two games due to a right hip contusion, eight games due to a strained left hamstring, and four games due to an NBA suspension. He consequently played 55 games in 2004–05, averaging 9.6 points and 5.9 rebounds in 23.9 minutes per game.

In 2005–06, Nenê missed 81 games after suffering a torn ACL in his right knee after just three minutes of action against the San Antonio Spurs in the Denver's season opening game on November 1.

After re-signing with the Nuggets to a six-year, $60 million contract on July 20, 2006, Nenê returned to action in 2006–07, averaging 12.2 points and 7.0 rebounds in 64 games (42 starts).

In 2007–08, Nenê played in just 16 games, averaging 5.3 points and 5.4 rebounds in 16.6 minutes per game. He suffered a torn ulner collateral ligament in his left thumb against the Boston Celtics on November 7 and missed the next 22 games.

On January 11, 2008, Nenê released a statement saying that he was taking an indefinite leave of absence from the Denver Nuggets to address a medical issue. Three days later, he had a malignant testicular tumor removed at a Denver hospital. His right testicle was removed as well. He returned to action on March 27, 2008, in the Nuggets' 118–105 home win over the Dallas Mavericks. Nenê entered the game with 1:17 left in the fourth quarter to a standing ovation.

Nenê missed 37 games between January 11 and March 24, 2008 after his bout with testicular cancer. A right groin strain also forced him to miss the final six games of the season.

In response to his poor run of injuries and missed time, Nenê had a career-best year in 2008–09. He appeared in 77 games (76 starts) and averaged career-highs of 14.6 points, 7.8 rebounds and 1.31 blocks, in addition to 1.23 steals in 32.6 minutes per game. He subsequently finished fifth in voting for the 2008–09 NBA Most Improved Player award. He also ranked second in the NBA in field goal percentage (.604 – 428-of-709), the best single-season mark in Nuggets' franchise history.

In 2009–10, Nenê played and started all 82 games for the first time in his career and averaged 13.8 points, 7.6 rebounds, a career-high 2.5 assists, 1.4 steals and 1.0 blocks in a career-high 33.6 minutes per game.

In 2010–11, Nenê appeared in 75 games (starting all 75), averaging 14.5 points, 7.6 rebounds, 2.0 assists, and 1.12 steals while shooting an NBA-leading .615 from the field in 30.5 minutes per game.

On December 14, 2011, Nenê re-signed with the Nuggets to a five-year, $67 million contract.

Washington Wizards (2012–2016)
On March 15, 2012, Nenê was traded to the Washington Wizards in a three-way trade involving the Nuggets and the Los Angeles Clippers. He averaged 13.7 points and 7.5 rebounds in 39 total games (33 starts) with Washington and Denver during the lockout-shortened 2011–12 season.

In 2012–13, Nenê averaged 12.6 points, 6.7 rebounds and 2.9 assists in 27.2 minutes per game in 61 games (49 starts). On January 21, 2013, he scored a season-high 24 points in a 98–95 win over the Portland Trail Blazers.

On November 26, 2013, Nenê scored a career-high 30 points in a 116–111 win over the Los Angeles Lakers. Later that season, on February 22, Nenê matched that career-high in a 94–93 win over the New Orleans Pelicans.

In 2014–15, various injuries and ailments limited Nenê's ability to produce at an optimum level, though he appeared in the most games (67) in five years. Towards the end of the season, when Nenê was relegated to more a supporting role to Marcin Gortat, he was a better rebounder and did more of the dirty work required. He averaged 11.0 points and 5.1 rebounds on 51.1% shooting during the season.

Nenê appeared in 12 of team's first 13 games to begin the 2015–16 season, but between November 28 and January 3, he missed 19 straight games with a strained left calf. On March 14, 2016, he scored a season-high 20 points off the bench in a 124–81 win over the Detroit Pistons, Washington's largest victory since the 2002–03 season.

Houston Rockets (2016–2020)
On July 20, 2016, Nenê signed with the Houston Rockets. He made his debut for the Rockets in their season opener on October 26, 2016, scoring seven points off the bench in a 120–114 loss to the Los Angeles Lakers. On January 5, 2017, he scored a season-high 18 points for his 12th double-digit game of the season in a 118–116 win over the Oklahoma City Thunder. On April 23, 2017, he scored a playoff career-high 28 points on a perfect 12-of-12 shooting from the field to help the Rockets go up 3–1 in the team's first-round playoff series against the Oklahoma City Thunder. On May 8, 2017, Nenê was ruled out for the remainder of the postseason with a left adductor tear. He suffered the injury the previous day in Game 4 of the Rockets' second-round playoff series against the San Antonio Spurs.

On July 6, 2017, Nenê re-signed with the Rockets. On December 16, 2017, he scored a season-high 16 points in a 115–111 win over the Milwaukee Bucks.

Nenê missed the first 21 games of the 2018–19 season with a strained right calf. Nenê's final NBA game was Game 6 of the 2019 Western Conference Semifinals against the Golden State Warriors on May 10th, 2019. In his final game, Nenê recorded 2 points, 2 rebounds, 1 assist and 1 block. He declined his $3.8 million player option, thus making him a free agent.

On September 3, 2019, Nenê re-signed with the Rockets. Most of his 2019-20 salary was non-guaranteed in the form of a likely bonus.  The NBA suspected cap circumvention and ruled that Nenê's salary value in a trade would only be the guaranteed $2.6 million and not the full value of $10 million. 

Due to a lingering hip injury, Nenê was unable to play in a single game for the Rockets in 2019-20. On February 5, 2020, Nenê was traded to the Atlanta Hawks in a four-team, 12-player trade. The following day, Nenê was waived by the Hawks.

National team career
Nenê has been a member of the senior Brazilian national basketball team. With Brazil, he played at the following major tournaments: the 2001 FIBA AmeriCup, the 2003 FIBA AmeriCup, the 2007 FIBA AmeriCup, the 2012 Summer Olympics, the 2014 FIBA World Cup, and the 2016 Summer Olympics. He won the silver medal at the 2001 FIBA AmeriCup.

Personal life
On January 14, 2008, Nenê had a malignant testicular tumor removed. His right testicle was removed as well. In the years after his cancer scare, Nenê, a Christian, said God used cancer to test him and prepare him for helping others. Upon retiring from basketball, Nenê plans to become involved with church activities in Brazil.

Nenê has three sons with wife Lauren Prothe.

NBA career statistics

Regular season

|-
| style="text-align:left;"|
| style="text-align:left;"|Denver
| 80 || 53 || 28.2 || .519 || .000 || .578 || 6.1 || 1.9 || 1.6 || .8 || 10.5
|-
| style="text-align:left;"|
| style="text-align:left;"|Denver
| 77 || 77 || 32.5 || .530 || .000 || .682 || 6.5 || 2.2 || 1.5 || .5 || 11.8
|-
| style="text-align:left;"|
| style="text-align:left;"|Denver
| 55 || 18 || 23.9 || .503 || .000 || .660 || 5.9 || 1.5 || .9 || .9 || 9.6
|-
| style="text-align:left;"|
| style="text-align:left;"|Denver
| 1 || 0 || 3.0 || .000 ||  ||  || .0 || .0 || .0 || .0 || .0
|-
| style="text-align:left;"|
| style="text-align:left;"|Denver
| 64 || 42 || 26.8 || .570 || .000 || .689 || 7.0 || 1.2 || 1.0 || .9 || 12.2
|-
| style="text-align:left;"|
| style="text-align:left;"|Denver
| 16 || 1 || 16.6 || .408 || .000 || .551 || 5.4 || .9 || .6 || .9 || 5.3
|-
| style="text-align:left;"|
| style="text-align:left;"|Denver
| 77 || 76 || 32.6 || .604 || .200 || .723 || 7.8 || 1.4 || 1.2 || 1.3 || 14.6
|-
| style="text-align:left;"|
| style="text-align:left;"|Denver
| 82 || 82 || 33.6 || .587 || .000 || .704 || 7.6 || 2.5 || 1.4 || 1.0 || 13.8
|-
| style="text-align:left;"|
| style="text-align:left;"|Denver
| 75 || 75 || 30.5 || style="background:#cfecec;"|.615* || .200 || .711 || 7.6 || 2.0 || 1.1 || 1.0 || 14.5
|-
| style="text-align:left;"|
| style="text-align:left;"|Denver
| 28 || 27 || 29.5 || .509 || .000 || .677 || 7.4 || 2.2 || 1.3 || .9 || 13.4
|-
| style="text-align:left;"|
| style="text-align:left;"|Washington
| 11 || 6 || 25.8 || .607 || .000 || .657 || 7.5 || 1.7 || .5 || 1.2 || 14.5
|-
| style="text-align:left;"|
| style="text-align:left;"|Washington
| 61 || 49 || 27.2 || .480 || .000 || .729 || 6.7 || 2.9 || .9 || .6 || 12.6
|-
| style="text-align:left;"|
| style="text-align:left;"|Washington
| 53 || 37 || 29.4 || .503 || .200 || .583 || 5.5 || 2.9 || 1.2 || .9 || 14.2
|-
| style="text-align:left;"|
| style="text-align:left;"|Washington
| 67 || 58 || 25.3 || .511 || .200 || .604 || 5.1 || 1.8 || 1.0 || .3 || 11.0
|-
| style="text-align:left;"|
| style="text-align:left;"|Washington
| 57 || 11 || 19.2 || .544 || .000 || .578 || 4.5 || 1.7 || .9 || .5 || 9.2
|-
| style="text-align:left;"|
| style="text-align:left;"|Houston
| 67 || 8 || 17.9 || .617 || .333 || .589 || 4.2 || 1.0 || .8 || .6 || 9.1
|-
| style="text-align:left;"|
| style="text-align:left;"|Houston
| 52 || 4 || 14.6 || .569 || .000 || .636 || 3.4 || 0.9 || .5 || .3 || 6.5
|-
| style="text-align:left;"|
| style="text-align:left;"|Houston
| 42 || 2 || 13.0 || .517 || .000 || .660 || 2.9 || 0.6 || .4 || .4 || 3.6
|-
| style="text-align:center;" colspan="2"|Career
| 965 || 626 || 26.2 || .548 || .132 || .660 || 6.0 || 1.8 || 1.1 || .7 || 11.3

Playoffs

|-
| style="text-align:left;"|2004
| style="text-align:left;"|Denver
| 5 || 5 || 26.4 || .444 ||  || .538 || 5.0 || 3.0 || 1.0 || .6 || 11.2
|-
| style="text-align:left;"|2005
| style="text-align:left;"|Denver
| 5 || 0 || 20.2 || .429 ||  || .652 || 5.0 || .4 || .4 || .4 || 6.6
|-
| style="text-align:left;"|2007
| style="text-align:left;"|Denver
| 5 || 5 || 35.8 || .585 ||  || .778 || 7.8 || 2.4 || .6 || .6 || 15.2
|-
| style="text-align:left;"|2008
| style="text-align:left;"|Denver
| 3 || 0 || 10.0 || .556 ||  || 1.000 || 2.3 || .3 || .7 || .3 || 4.3
|-
| style="text-align:left;"|2009
| style="text-align:left;"|Denver
| 16 || 16 || 32.8 || .548 ||  || .657 || 7.5 || 2.6 || 1.3 || .6 || 11.5
|-
| style="text-align:left;"|2010
| style="text-align:left;"|Denver
| 5 || 5 || 33.8 || .621 ||  || .583 || 5.8 || 2.2 || 1.2 || .2 || 11.4
|-
| style="text-align:left;"|2011
| style="text-align:left;"|Denver
| 5 || 5 || 32.4 || .478 ||  || .563 || 9.0 || 1.6 || 1.0 || .8 || 14.2
|-
| style="text-align:left;"|2014
| style="text-align:left;"|Washington
| 10 || 10 || 32.5 || .464 ||  || .346 || 5.3 || 2.6 || .9 || 1.1 || 13.7
|-
| style="text-align:left;"|2015
| style="text-align:left;"|Washington
| 10 || 10 || 25.7 || .447 ||  || .478 || 6.6 || 1.5 || .9 || .3 || 7.9
|-
| style="text-align:left;"|2017
| style="text-align:left;"|Houston
| 9 || 0 || 17.9 || .706 || .000 || .581 || 4.7 || .6 || .7 || .4 || 10.0
|-
| style="text-align:left;"|2018
| style="text-align:left;"|Houston
| 11 || 0 || 9.7 || .600 ||  || .636 || 2.5 || .5 || .2 || .5 || 2.8
|-
| style="text-align:left;"|2019
| style="text-align:left;"|Houston
| 7 || 0 || 7.6 || 1.000 ||  || .778 || 2.0 || 0.4 || 0.4 || 0.3 || 3.9
|-
| style="text-align:center;" colspan="2"|Career
| 91 || 56 || 24.2|| .530 || .000 || .595 || 5.4 || 1.6 || .8 || .5 || 9.2

References

External links

 ESPN.com profile
 FIBA Profile

1982 births
Living people
2014 FIBA Basketball World Cup players
Basketball players at the 2012 Summer Olympics
Basketball players at the 2016 Summer Olympics
Brazilian expatriate basketball people in the United States
Brazilian men's basketball players
Centers (basketball)
Competitors at the 2001 Goodwill Games
CR Vasco da Gama basketball players
Denver Nuggets players
Goodwill Games medalists in basketball
Houston Rockets players
National Basketball Association players from Brazil
New York Knicks draft picks
Novo Basquete Brasil players
Olympic basketball players of Brazil
People from São Carlos
Power forwards (basketball)
Washington Wizards players
Sportspeople from São Paulo (state)
Brazilian American
American people of Brazilian descent